Bounty Hunters 2: Hardball is a 1997 American/Canadian action film, starring Michael Dudikoff and Lisa Howard. It was directed by George Erschbamer. The film is a sequel to Bounty Hunters.

Plot
Incompatible fugitive recovery agents, Jersey Bellini (Michael Dudikoff) and B.B. (Lisa Howard) are back in action again for the last time.

Cast
 Michael Dudikoff as Jersey Bellini 
 Lisa Howard as B.B.
 Tony Curtis as Wald
 Steve Bacic as Carlos
 L. Harvey Gold as Santos
 Pablo Coffey as Theodore Tyler
 Reese McBeth as 'Chili'
 April Telek as Fiona
 Claire Riley as Lieutenant Ortega
 Garry Chalk as Wasser
 Dale Wilson as Chuck Ramsey
 Alex Green as Bass
 Wayne Knechcel as Vassone
 Harvey Dumansky as Unger
 Robert Moloney as Celia Goffman
 Charles Andre as Bruno
 Randy Bird as Officer Jones
 Kirk Jarrett as Hitman
 Jean Ferguson as The Masseuse
 Glen Barwise as Fiance (uncredited)

Reception
Robert Pardi from TV Guide gave the film two out of four and stated: "This devil-may-care action picture makes fun of its scenario's staleness while supplying the expected action set pieces; even the tongue-in-cheek performances of the leads don't dissipate the thrills". Pardi concluded about the film: "Directed with considerable gusto, this free-for-all works both on the level of self-parody and as a genuinely exciting Mafia escapade."

References

External links
 Bounty Hunters 2: Hardball at Miramax
 
 
 

1997 films
1997 action comedy films
American action comedy films
Canadian action comedy films
English-language Canadian films
1990s English-language films
1990s American films
1990s Canadian films